Sanyati District is a district of the Province Mashonaland West in Zimbabwe.

References

Districts of Mashonaland West Province